Zoran Ćirić (born in 1962) is a writer from Niš, Serbia. He writes poetry and prose.

Ćirić received the NIN award in 2001 for his novel Hobo.

Novels 

 Prisluškivanje (2000)
 Hobo (2001)
 Smrt u El Pasu (2003)
 Slivnik (2004)
 Gang of Four (2005)
 Noć svih svetih (2009)
 Lanac slobode (2019)

References

1962 births
Living people
Serbian male short story writers
Serbian short story writers
Serbian novelists
Serbian male poets
Writers from Niš